1-Deoxynojirimycin (DNJ or 1-DNJ), also called duvoglustat or moranolin, is an alpha-glucosidase inhibitor, most commonly found in mulberry leaves. Although it can be obtained in small quantities by brewing an herbal tea from mulberry leaves, interest in commercial production has led to research on developing mulberry tea higher in DNJ, and on alternate routes of production, such as via Bacillus species.

Biosynthesis 
1-Deoxynojirimycin is a polyhydroxylated piperidine alkaloid produced from D-Glucose in various plants, such as Commelina communis, and in the Streptomyces and Bacillus bacteria. High quantities of this azasugar are produced in Bacillus subtilis, a process initiated by a TYB gene cluster composed of gabT1 (aminotransferase), yktc1 (phosphatase), and gutB1 (oxidoreductase).

In Bacillus subtilis, D-glucose first undergoes glycolysis, opening the 6 member ring and producing fructose-6-phosphate. GabT1 catalyzes transamination at the C2 position, followed by a dephosphorylation by the Yktc1 enzyme, resulting in 2-amino-2-deoxy-D-mannitol (ADM), an essential precursor. Regio-selective oxidation by GutB1 occurs at the exposed C6 hydroxyl of ADM, pushing a C2-N-C6 cyclization of the resulting 6-oxo intermediate, creating Manojirimycin (MJ). Epimerization of MJ at the C2 position yields the nojirimycin isomer. Nojirimycin is then dehydrated (loss of -OH at C1 position), along with reduction of the imine moiety. This results in the product 1-DNJ.

Pathway variations 
In the Streptomyces subrutilus species, a secondary pathway branching from the manojirimycin precursor results in 1-deoxymanojirimycin via dehydration and reduction of the isomer. However, Bacillus subtilis does not produce 1-deoxymanojirimycin despite the presence of the manojirimycin precursor.

Azasugar biosynthesis in Commelina communis involves C1-C5 cyclisation of the original D-glucose precursor without the subsequent inversion.

See also
 Nojirimycin
 1-Deoxygalactonojirimycin, a stereoisomer of 1-deoxynojirimycin

References

Iminosugars